Alexander Ally Karim (born 26 May 1976) is a Swedish actor and writer. He made waves as Frank Nordling on TV3's Advokaten, as he was the first black actor to play a lead character in a primetime drama in Sweden.

Background
Karim was born Alexander Kimbugwe Karim on 26 May 1976 in Uppsala, Sweden to a family of refugees from Uganda who came to Sweden in 1975 to escape despotic president Idi Amin. He has two brothers: director Othman "Osmond" Karim and director Baker Karim.

Karim is married with three children.

Career
After completing the high school, he moved, as well as his brothers before him, to the United States and City College in Los Angeles, where they all trained as actors. He later worked at The Hudson Theater in the same city. In 2000, Karim moved back to Sweden and started working in film. In his first movie from the same year, the short film Rampljus (Stage Lights), which is about an unemployed actor in Helsingborg, he collaborated with his brother Baker. The film was a great success and won the best film in the category "heavyweight" at the November festival in Trollhättan. 

In the jury in Trollhättan was Lukas Moodysson. Together with Lars von Trier they contacted the brothers Karim, who played in their biofilm Fyra kvinnor (2001), written and directed by Baker Karim. Shortly after this, Alexander Karim played the title role in Malcolm (2002), to which he also wrote a script. The same year he also participated as Amir in the short film Tompta Gudh. Malcolm won both the audience prize and the jury prize at the Gothenburg Film Festival 2002, was nominated for a Guldbagge Awards, and was nominated on the critic week in Cannes. Also Karim's next movie, the card film The Apple Tree (2003), which is about two African brothers struggling in chilly Sweden, was nominated in Cannes. In 2005 he participated in Brothers Osmond film Om Sara and 2006 in Amir Chamdins Om Gud vill. 

Karim has also participated in several TV series, including Orka! Orka! (2004), En decemberdröm (2005), Lasermannen (2006) and Andra Avenyn (2007). In 2009 he participated in the autobiographical SVT series about the family Babajou, which he also scripted together with his brother Baker. He was also included in the 2006 set at the Fredriksdalsteatern in Herrskap och tjänstehjon where he played Florindo Al Dente in the 19th century Venice. 

He played Vanheden in the reboot of Jönssonligan 2015, called Jönssonligan – Den perfekta stöten. 

Karim has starred in television series such as SVT's Äkta människor, TV3's Advokaten, and FX's Tyrant He has also had roles in films such as the Johan Falk series, Double Play, Dying of the Light, and Zero Dark Thirty. In 2019, Karim was a celebrity guest on Stjärnorna på slottet, where he spoke about his life and career. He recently finished filming the film The Woman Under the Bed and the show The Box and is currently filming The Swarm, a television series released in 2023.

In 2019, Karim published his first book, novel Den extraordinära berättelsen om Jonas Paulssons plötsliga död, followed by a children's book called Modigast i världen, which he co-wrote with his wife, Malin Karim. In June 2021, Karim and best-selling author Camilla Läckberg released an audiobook based on their co-written script Glacier. The story has also been adapted into a film starring Karim and Lena Endre and directed by Baker Karim.

Filmography

Television

Film

Bibliography
2019 - Den extraordinära berättelsen om Jonas Paulssons plötsliga 
2019 - Modigast i världen

References

21st-century Swedish male actors
1976 births
Living people
People from Uppsala
Swedish people of Ugandan descent